Not guilty may refer to:
 Not guilty plea, a plea by which a person charged with one or more criminal offenses denies committing them
 Acquittal, the legal result of a verdict of not guilty
Not Guilty (1908 film), a French film
 Not Guilty (1910 film), an American film by the Thanhouser Company
 Not Guilty (1919 film), a British film
 Not Guilty (1921 film), an American film
 Not Guilty (1947 film), a French film
 "Not Guilty" (song), a song by George Harrison